Body and Soul is a 1925 race film produced, written, directed, and distributed by Oscar Micheaux and starring Paul Robeson in his motion picture debut. In 2019, the film was selected by the Library of Congress for inclusion in the National Film Registry for being "culturally, historically, or aesthetically significant".

Plot
An escaped prisoner seeks refuge in the predominantly African-American town of Tatesville, Georgia, by passing himself off as the Rt. Reverend Isaiah T. Jenkins. He is joined in town by a fellow criminal, and the pair scheme to swindle the phony reverend's congregation of their offerings. Jenkins falls in love with a young member of his congregation, Isabelle Perkins, even though she is in love with a poor young man named Sylvester, who happens to be Jenkins’ long-estranged identical twin brother. Jenkins steals money from Martha Jane, Isabelle's mother, and convinces the young woman to take the blame for his crime. She flees to Atlanta and dies just as her mother locates her. Before dying, Isabelle reveals to her mother that Jenkins raped her and that he is the one who took her mother's money. She explains that she did not speak up before because she knew her mother would not believe her. Returning to Tatesville, Martha Jane confronts Jenkins in front of the congregation. Jenkins flees and during a twilight struggle he kills a man who tries to bring him to justice. The following morning, Martha Jane awakens and realizes the episode with Jenkins was only a dream. She provides Isabelle (who is not dead) and Sylvester with the funds to start a married life together.

Cast
Paul Robeson as Reverend Isaiah T. Jenkins / His brother Sylvester
Mercedes Gilbert as Sister Martha Jane - Isabelle's Mother
Julia Theresa Russell as Isabelle - the Girl
Lawrence Chenault as Yello-Curley' Hinds - the Phony Reverend's Former Jailmate
Marshall Rogers as Speakeasy proprietor
Lillian Johnson as "Sis" Caline, a Pious Lady
Madame Robinson as "Sis" Lucy, a Pious Lady
Chester A. Alexander as Deacon Simpkins, a Church Elder
Walter Cornick as Brother Amos, a Church Elder

Production
Paul Robeson made his film debut at the age of 27 in Body and Soul, playing the dual role of Jenkins and Sylvester. As part of the agreement to star in the film, Robeson received a $100 per week salary plus three percent of the gross after the first $40,000 in receipts.

Release
The original version of Body and Soul was a nine-reel production. When the filmmaker applied for an exhibition license from the Motion Picture Commission of the State of New York, it was denied approval on the grounds it would "tend to incite to crime" and was "immoral" and "sacrilegious". Micheaux was forced to re-edit the film twice before the commission approved the film, which was reduced from nine to five reels. The surviving copy of Body and Soul is based on this edited version; Micheaux's director cut is considered a lost film. Body and Soul is one of three surviving silent films created by Micheaux, who is credited with making 26 silent productions. Body and Soul holds an 80% approval rating on aggregate film site Rotten Tomatoes.

Body and Soul was originally released to cinemas catering to an exclusive African-American audience, and for many years the film was unknown to white moviegoers. In 2000, Body and Soul was presented at the New York Film Festival with a new musical score composed by trombonist Wycliffe Gordon and performed live by the Lincoln Center Jazz Orchestra.

Body and Soul was released on home video in 2016 by Kino Lorber as part of the five-disc Pioneers of African-American Cinema set.

References

External links
 
 
 
 
 

1925 films
1925 drama films
American black-and-white films
Films directed by Oscar Micheaux
American silent feature films
Race films
Films about rape
Films about dreams
Films set in Atlanta
Silent American drama films
United States National Film Registry films
1920s American films
1920s English-language films